The 82nd Academy Awards ceremony, presented by the Academy of Motion Picture Arts and Sciences (AMPAS), honored the best films of 2009 and took place on March 7, 2010, at the Kodak Theatre in Hollywood, Los Angeles beginning at 5:30 p.m. PST / 8:30 p.m. EST. The ceremony was scheduled after its usual late-February date to avoid conflicting with the 2010 Winter Olympics. During the ceremony, the Academy of Motion Picture Arts and Sciences presented Academy Awards (commonly referred to as Oscars) in 24 categories. The ceremony was televised in the United States by ABC, and was produced by Bill Mechanic and Adam Shankman and directed by Hamish Hamilton. Actors Alec Baldwin and Steve Martin hosted the show. Martin hosted for the third time; he first presided over the 73rd ceremony held in 2001 and last hosted the 75th ceremony held in 2003. Meanwhile, this was Baldwin's first Oscars hosting stint. This was also the first telecast to have multiple hosts since the 59th ceremony held in 1987.

On June 24, 2009, Academy president Sid Ganis announced at a press conference that, in an attempt to revitalize interest surrounding the awards, the 2010 ceremony would feature ten Best Picture nominees instead of five, a practice that had been discontinued after the 16th ceremony in 1944. On February 20, 2010, in a ceremony at the Beverly Wilshire Hotel in Beverly Hills, California, the Academy Awards for Technical Achievement were presented by host Elizabeth Banks.

The Hurt Locker won six awards, including Best Picture. Other winners were Avatar with three awards, Crazy Heart, Precious: Based on the Novel 'Push' by Sapphire, and Up with two, and The Blind Side, The Cove, Inglourious Basterds, Logorama, Music by Prudence, The New Tenants, The Secret in Their Eyes, Star Trek, and The Young Victoria with one. The telecast garnered nearly 42 million viewers in the United States, making it the most watched Oscar telecast since the 77th Academy Awards in 2005.

Winners and nominees 

The nominees for the 82nd Academy Awards were announced on February 2, 2010, at 5:38 a.m. PST (13:38 UTC) at the Samuel Goldwyn Theater in Beverly Hills, California, by Tom Sherak, president of the Academy, and actress Anne Hathaway. Avatar and The Hurt Locker led the nominations with nine each.

The winners were announced during the awards ceremony on March 7, 2010. Kathryn Bigelow made history as the first female to win the Oscar for Best Director. Up became the second animated film to be nominated for Best Picture. 1991's Beauty and the Beast was the first such film to achieve this feat. Best Adapted Screenplay winner Geoffrey Fletcher was the first African American winner of a screenwriting Oscar.

Awards 

Winners are listed first, highlighted in boldface and indicated with a double dagger.

Honorary Academy Awards 

The Academy held its 1st Annual Governors Awards ceremony on November 14, 2009, during which the following awards were presented.

Academy Honorary Award 
 Lauren Bacall  In recognition of her central place in the golden age of motion pictures.
 Roger Corman  For his rich engendering of films and filmmakers.
 Gordon Willis  For unsurpassed mastery of light, shadow, color and motion.

Irving G. Thalberg Memorial Award 
 John Calley

Films with multiple nominations and awards 

The following 22 films received multiple nominations:

The following five films received multiple awards:

Presenters and performers
The following individuals, listed in order of appearance, presented awards or performed musical numbers.

Presenters

Performers

Ceremony information

Because of the declining viewership of recent Academy Awards ceremonies, the Academy sought ideas to revamp the show while renewing interest with the nominated films. After the previous year's telecast, which saw a 13% increase in viewership, many within the Motion Picture Academy proposed new ways to give the awards a more populist appeal. AMPAS then-president Sid Ganis announced that the ceremony would feature ten Best Picture nominees, rather than traditional five. The expansion was a throwback to the Academy's early years in the 1930s and 1940s, when eight to twelve films were nominated. "Having 10 Best Picture nominees is going to allow Academy voters to recognize and include some of the fantastic movies that often show up in the other Oscar categories, but have been squeezed out of the race for the top prize," Sid Ganis said in a press conference. "I can't wait to see what that list of ten looks like when the nominees are announced in February." Ganis also said that became difficult to get a clear winner. A cause of this was required a change in the voting system from first-past-the-post to alternative vote.

Choreographer Adam Shankman and Bill Mechanic were hired as producers for the ceremony. Shankman revealed in an interview on NPR's Fresh Air that he and Mechanic had originally chosen Sacha Baron Cohen as the host, but the Academy rejected this proposal because Baron Cohen was "too much of a wild card."

Many of the previous year's well-received elements returned. Five actors with a personal connection with each of the nominees presented the Best Actor and Best Actress awards. Shankman and Mechanic announced their intention to make the running time of the telecast shorter. Most presenters this year introduced each winner with the phrase "And the winner is ..." rather than "And the Oscar goes to..." for the first time since 1988. The Academy gave no reason for the change to a phrase which it had once felt humiliating to the other nominees; but apparently acquiesced in Shankman and Mechanic's decision to return to the older phrase. David Rockwell's proscenium curtain, decorated with 100,000 Swarovski crystals, was reused as part of the stage design for this year's telecast. Unlike most Oscar ceremonies, however, Mechanic and Shankman announced that none of the five songs nominated for Best Original Song would be performed live.

Box office performance of nominated films
For the first time since 2003, the field of major nominees included at least one blockbuster at the American and Canadian box offices. Five of the nominees had grossed over $100 million before the nominations were announced. Many critics, reporters, and entertainment industry analysts cite the AMPAS's decision to expand the roster of Best Picture nominees from five to ten films as one of the reasons for this.

Three of the ten Best Picture nominees were among the top ten releases in box office during the nominations. At the time of the announcement on February 2, Avatar was the highest-grossing film among the Best Picture nominees with $596 million in domestic box office receipts. Other top-ten domestic box office hits nominated were Up with $293 million, and The Blind Side with $237.9 million. Among the remaining seven nominees, Inglourious Basterds was the next highest-grossing film with $120.5 million followed by District 9 ($115.6 million), Up in the Air ($73 million), Precious: Based on the Novel 'Push' by Sapphire ($45 million), The Hurt Locker ($12 million), An Education ($9.4 million) and finally A Serious Man ($9.2 million).

Of the top 50 grossing films of the year, 46 nominations went to 13 films on the list. Only Avatar (1st), Up (5th), The Blind Side (8th), Inglourious Basterds (25th), District 9 (27th), The Princess and the Frog (32nd), Julie & Julia (34th), Coraline (42nd) and Up in the Air (43rd) were nominated for directing, acting, screenwriting, Best Picture or Animated Feature. The other top-50 box office hits that earned nominations were Harry Potter and the Half-Blood Prince (2nd), Transformers: Revenge of the Fallen (3rd), Star Trek (7th) and Sherlock Holmes (11th).

Oscar advertising and viewership issues
On March 1, 2010, WABC-TV New York, ABC's flagship station, announced that it would likely end its services with cable television company Cablevision on March 7, 2010, the weekend of the 82nd Academy Awards. The station was removed from Cablevision's lineup at 12:01 a.m. ET on March 7. Over 3.1 million viewers in the New York City viewing area, the nation's largest media market, would have been unable to watch the Oscars (and other station-related and ABC-related programming), and it was projected to cause a devastating blow to advertisers and viewership for the Oscars. At about 8:43 p.m. ET, thirteen minutes after the awards ceremony began, Cablevision resumed transmission of the WABC feed.

Music by Prudence acceptance speech
Shortly after Music by Prudence director Roger Ross Williams began his speech accepting the Oscar for Best Documentary Short Subject, he was suddenly interrupted by Elinor Burkett, his co-producer. The scene was described as the ceremony's weirdest or most awkward moment, and was compared by Williams and others to Kanye West's interruption of Taylor Swift's acceptance of the Best Female Video Award at the 2009 MTV Video Music Awards five months earlier.

Burkett, who lives in Zimbabwe where most of the film was shot, had sued Williams over the finished film, a suit that had been settled by the time of the ceremony. She explained to Salon.com, to which she was once a contributor, that the film had been her idea. "Roger had never even heard of Zimbabwe before I told him about this." She had been upset that Williams and HBO chose to focus on one person instead of the entire band, as the members had been led to believe. "I felt my role in this has been denigrated again and again, and it wasn't going to happen this time." She hustled onstage because, she claimed, Williams' mother had blocked her from going down with her cane to prevent her from sharing the stage.

"She just ambushed me", said Williams, "I just expected her to stand there. I had a speech prepared." He said it was made clear by the Academy that only one person can give an acceptance speech. He said his mother had merely gotten up to hug him.

Critical reviews
The show received a mixed reception from media publications. Some media outlets were more critical of the show. Film critic Roger Ebert criticized the opening monologue of Baldwin and Martin saying it was "surprisingly unfunny". He later went on to say that there was joy that The Hurt Locker won, but choice of Baldwin and Martin as host was wrong. Los Angeles Times columnist Mary McNamara quipped that the show had no sense of timing saying, "Despite everyone's best efforts, this year's Oscars seemed to suffer from a crisis of confidence." Time television critic James Poniewozik also criticized "the choppy paced" ceremony stating, it was "a classic Oscar failing". He also noted that having two hosts was a disadvantage.

Other media outlets received the broadcast more positively. The Boston Globe television critic Matthew Gilbert lauded the hosts performance saying that "The delivery was expert and warmly conversational, like one of those old-school comedy teams." Hank Stuever of The Washington Post remarked that the telecast "moved along with precision and smart decisions." He also praised Baldwin and Martin writing that they "proved to be classy and quippy throughout the night." Maureen Ryan of the Chicago Tribune gave an average critique of the ceremony but acclaimed the cast.

Ratings and reception
The American telecast on ABC drew in an average of 41.62 million people over its length, which was a 13% increase from the previous year's ceremony. An estimated 79.68 million total viewers watched all or part of the awards. The show also drew higher Nielsen ratings compared to the two previous ceremonies with 24.89% of households watching over a 36.69 share. In addition, the program scored a higher 18-49 demo rating with a 12.71 rating over a 31.51 share among viewers in that demographic. It was the highest viewership for an Academy Award telecast since the 77th ceremony held in 2005.

In July 2010, the ceremony presentation received 12 nominations at the 62nd Primetime Emmys. The following month, the ceremony won one of those nominations for Outstanding Art Direction for Variety, Music or Nonfiction Programming (David Rockwell and Joe Celli).

In Memoriam
The annual In Memoriam tribute, produced by Chuck Workman, was presented by actress Demi Moore. Singer James Taylor performed The Beatles' song "In My Life" during the tribute.

 Patrick Swayze – Actor
 Maurice Jarre – Composer
 Monte Hale – Actor
 Jean Simmons – Actress
 Tullio Pinelli – Writer
 Éric Rohmer – Director
 Ken Annakin – Director
 David Carradine – Actor
 Gareth Wigan – Executive
 Daniel Melnick –  Producer
 Howard Zieff – Director
 Dom DeLuise – Actor
 Army Archerd – Journalist
 Ron Silver – Actor
 Brittany Murphy – Actress
 Lou Jacobi – Actor
 Simon Channing Williams – Producer
 Betsy Blair – Actress
 Joseph Wiseman – Actor
 Jack Cardiff – Cinematographer
 Kathryn Grayson – Actress
 Arthur Canton – Public relations
 Nat Boxer – Sound
 Millard Kaufman – Writer
 Roy E. Disney – Executive
 Larry Gelbart – Writer
 Horton Foote – Writer
 Robert Woodruff Anderson – Writer
 Budd Schulberg – Writer
 Michael Jackson – Musician
 Natasha Richardson – Actress
 Jennifer Jones – Actress
 David Brown – Producer
 Karl Malden – Actor

A separate tribute was held earlier in the evening for the late filmmaker John Hughes, presented by actors Matthew Broderick, Molly Ringwald, Judd Nelson, Ally Sheedy, Anthony Michael Hall, Macaulay Culkin and Jon Cryer. The 77th telecast had previously featured a special memorial to Johnny Carson presented by Chris Rock and Whoopi Goldberg.

See also 
 16th Screen Actors Guild Awards
 30th Golden Raspberry Awards
 52nd Grammy Awards
 62nd Primetime Emmy Awards
 63rd British Academy Film Awards
 64th Tony Awards
 List of submissions to the 82nd Academy Awards for Best Foreign Language Film

References

External links

Official websites
 Academy Awards Official website
 The Academy of Motion Picture Arts and Sciences Official website
 Oscar's Channel at YouTube (run by the Academy of Motion Picture Arts and Sciences)

News resources
 Oscars 2010 BBC News
 Academy Awards coverage CNN
 The Envelope Awards insider Los Angeles Times
 Academy Award nominations: Hollywood plods on World Socialist Web Site February 5, 2010

Analysis
 2009 Academy Awards Winners and History Filmsite
 Academy Awards, USA: 2010 Internet Movie Database

Other resources
 

Academy Awards ceremonies
2009 film awards
2010 in Los Angeles
2010 in American cinema
2010 awards in the United States
March 2010 events in the United States
Television shows directed by Hamish Hamilton (director)